The team championship, para-equestrian dressage event at the 2008 Summer Paralympics was decided by tests ridden at Hong Kong Olympic Equestrian Centre. Each rider performed two tests, the Team Test on September 7 and the Individual Championship Test on September 8–9 (for which individual medals were also awarded). Team scores were the sum of the best 3 Team Tests and best 3 Championship Test (not necessarily the same 3 riders).

Team ranking
TT = Team Test; CT = Championship Test; # = Score counted in team total. WD=withdrawn.

Team Test - Grade Ia

The Grade Ia Team Test was ridden on 7 September at 20:42.

Juror at E: Anne Prain; H: Kjell Myhre; C: Alison Mastin; M: Tarja Huttunen; B: Hanneke Gerritsen.

Team Test - Grade Ib

The Grade Ib Team Test was ridden on 7 September at 19:15.

Juror at E: Tarja Huttunen; H: Hanneke Gerritsen; C: Liliana Iannone; M: Janet Geary; B: Gudrun Hofinga.

Team Test - Grade II

The Grade II Team Test was ridden on 7 September at 08:41.

Juror at E: Janet Geary; H: Gudrun Hofinga; C: Anne Prain; M: Kjell Myhre; B: Alison Mastin.

Team Test - Grade III

The Grade III Team Test was ridden on 7 September at 07:30.

Juror at E: Kjell Myhre; H: Alison Mastin; C: Tarja Huttunen; M: Hanneke Gerritsen; B: Liliana Iannone.

Team Test - Grade IV

The Grade IV Team Test was ridden on 7 September at 22:15.

Juror at E: Liliana Iannone; H: Janet Geary; C: Gudrun Hofinga; M: Anne Prain; B: Kjell Myhre.

References

Equestrian at the 2008 Summer Paralympics